Manuel Lanzini (born 15 February 1993) is an Argentine professional footballer who plays as an attacking midfielder for  club West Ham United. He previously played for River Plate and Fluminense. He is regarded as having well developed dribbling skills, as well as good acceleration, vision, and an ability to ghost past defenders. He has been nicknamed "La Joya" ("the jewel").

Lanzini holds the distinction of the earliest goal scored in the Superclásico derby, scoring only 43 seconds into the match.

Career

Early career and beginnings at River Plate 
Lanzini stood out in indoor soccer football divisions, demonstrating his skills in the Club Academia Kaly de Ituzaingó class of 1993, a neighbourhood club. Ramón Maddoni, who has discovered players like Juan Román Riquelme, Carlos Tevez and Esteban Cambiasso, wanted to take him to Boca Juniors for a test match but the young Lanzini declined the call, stating that he only aimed to play for the club he supported: Club Atlético River Plate. Eventually, in 2002, he was taken to River Plate. He began training and started as a playmaker in junior divisions before, after several tests, Pedro Vega, ex-player and coach of inferior club divisions, ordered for him to be hired. In 2008, the eighth division team in which he played won its divisional trophy; Lanzini ultimately scored nine goals, only two fewer than fellow attacker Leonardo Salguero with 11 goals. On 2 November 2008, River Plate won the junior division's Superclásico 3–0 to Boca Juniors with Lanzini scoring two goals and assisting Salguero in one other.

Elevation to first team and debut at River Plate (2010–11 season) 

In 2010, Ángel Cappa, River Plate's first team coach, included Lanzini in the team for the winter preseason, disputing several matches in Salta Province. Lanzini made his informal debut in a friendly match against Central Norte, a 3–0 victory, coming on as a second-half substitute for Ariel Ortega. Lanzini then played another friendly match against Juventud Antoniana, where his performance earned good reception from press and fans alike.

Lanzini's performance in the 2010 winter preseason satisfied his coach. Finally, he made his first appearance on 8 August 2010, against Tigre for the first match of the 2010 Torneo Apertura. River Plate won 1–0 while Lanzini was replaced at half time by Facundo Affranchino.

Lanzini's appearance made him one of the youngest players to debut in the First Division for River Plate, being 17 years, 5 months and 24 days old, older only than Daniel Villalva, Adolfo Pedernera and ex-Barcelona and Real Madrid player Javier Saviola. After his debut, Cappa excluded him in the match against Huracán, but he replaced the suspended Ariel Ortega in the next game against Independiente where he assisted Rogelio Funes Mori's goal for the 3–2 victory. In a match against Vélez Sársfield on 5 September, Lanzini suffered an injury after a tackle from Leandro Somoza, which ruled him out for three weeks. He made his comeback to the first team on the 12th match of the season.

Fluminense (2011–12 season) 

On 19 July 2011, River Plate agreed to loan Lanzini to Fluminense for a fee of US$400,000, with a transfer option of $15,000,000.

Lanzini made his debut in the Brasileirao 2011 for the 3–0 victory against Figueirense. He would then score his first official goal in the team's 20th game of the tournament, a 2–1 victory against São Paulo. His performances and character led to the club's president labelling him "the new Neymar". His most important goal for the club was against Flamengo in the Río de Janeiro Fla-Flu derby.

Despite Lanzini's good performances, Fluminense was unable to retain him and he returned to River Plate after the loan expired.

Comeback to River Plate and consolidation

2012–13 season 

Lanzini returned on 30 June 2012. He started for the team's first appearance in the tournament, scoring their only goal in the 1–2 loss against Belgrano de Córdoba. For his comeback, he asked his coach Matías Almeyda if he could use the club's iconic number 10 shirt, which Almeyda approved. However, during Almeyda's term Lanzini was unable to assure himself a place on the pitch, sometimes watching the matches from the bench.

Almeyda was fired and the club's most successful coach to that date, ex-Inter Milan player Ramón Díaz, was appointed as team manager. With him, Lanzini's chance of regaining a place as a starter increased. Diaz made Lanzini a starter in the team's 2–0 victory against San Martín (SJ), where he scored one goal. He was then considered a regular starter for the team. During the 12th match of the Torneo Final 2013 tournament, he scored his first goal in the Superclásico, one of the most heated football rivalries in the world, in the 1–1 draw against Boca Juniors; this goal, as of 2018, stands out as the fastest goal in the derby's history (43 seconds). River Plate finished the season in 2nd place.

2013–14 season 

Following the 2013 Torneo Final season, Lanzini received an offer from the United Arab Emirates' Baniyas football team, but he turned down the offer because, citing his own father, he prioritized his professional sporting career over economic opportunities. He remained one of the team's strongest players in the Torneo Inicial 2013 and the international Copa Sudamericana 2013, but overall River Plate were inconsistent and did not win any trophies.

Conversely, 2014 was one of the best years in the club's history. River Plate won both the Torneo Final 2014 and the Copa Sudamericana 2014, knocking out Boca Juniors from the latter. Lanzini played for the team for half of the year, and was considered instrumental in helping to win the Torneo Inicial 2014 trophy. He scored again in the team's 2014 Superclásico victory against Boca Juniors, the so-called "Bombonerazo" which began a series of victories for River Plate over Boca Juniors. The Superclásico match also stood out because it definitively launched the career of Lanzini's teammate Ramiro Funes Mori, a defender who scored a header in the last minutes of the match; he would end up also playing in the Premier League, as Lanzini, for Everton FC. Lanzini finished the season with 2 goals in 18 appearances for the team.

Al Jazira Club 
On 6 August 2014, prior to the beginning of the 2014 Torneo de Transición Championship and Copa Sudamericana 2014, Lanzini transferred to the Al Jazira Club in the UAE Pro-League for $6,000,000 four-year deal, with a salary amounting to $12,000,000 in 3 years. This made him the youngest foreign player to play in the UAE Pro-League, at just 21 years old. He was signed as a replacement for Marseille-bound Abdelaziz Barrada, and had been courted by clubs in England, Spain, Italy and Turkey.

West Ham United

2015–16 season
On 22 July 2015, Lanzini signed for Premier League side West Ham United on a season-long loan, with an option to make the move permanent. He made his debut on 6 August in the UEFA Europa League third qualifying round away to Astra Giurgiu, starting the match and scoring in the third minute, however the Hammers lost 2–1 (4–3 on aggregate) and were eliminated. His league debut came on 15 August as a 76th-minute substitute for Cheikhou Kouyaté in a 1–2 home defeat to Leicester City. On 29 August, he scored his first league goal after just three minutes away to Liverpool, and assisted a goal from Mark Noble as the Hammers won 3–0 for their first victory at Anfield since 1963. In March 2016, West Ham confirmed that they had taken up the option to sign Lanzini on a permanent deal, with effect from 1 July 2016.

2016–17 season
Lanzini played 39 games in all competitions for West Ham, scoring eight goals. On 15 October 2016 he scored the only goal in a 1–0 win away to Crystal Palace to give West Ham their first away win of the season. His goal in a 1–0 win against Tottenham Hotspur on 5 May 2017 halted Tottenham's challenge to win the Premier League title. Tottenham, at the time, were on a nine-match winning run and were challenging Chelsea for the league title. On 9 May he was voted runner-up to Michail Antonio as Hammer of the Year and the Players’ Player of the Year.

2017–18 season
Lanzini made his first appearance of the season on 26 August 2017, in a 3–0 defeat away at Newcastle United. In the same game, Lanzini was caught by the elbow of Aleksandar Mitrović, who was later banned for three games as a result of the incident. Lanzini scored his first goal of the season in a 1–4 defeat at home to Liverpool on 4 November 2017, before adding a further two goals to his tally on 13 January 2018 in a 4–1 away win at Huddersfield Town. On 13 May, he scored twice in a 3–1 win over Everton, on the final day of the season.

2018–19 season
After being sidelined due to injury since May 2018, Lanzini made his first appearance of the season on 22 February 2019, coming on as a 76th minute substitute for Felipe Anderson in a 3–1 home win against Fulham. Lanzini made nine more league appearances during the 2018–19  season, scoring once in a 4–1 away win against Watford on the final day of the season.

2019–20 season
Lanzini made his first appearance of the season on 10 August 2019 in West Ham's opening game against 2018–19 Premier League Champions, Manchester City, resulting in a 5–0 loss. Following his 100th Premier League appearance, it was announced on 30 August 2019 that Lanzini had signed a new long-term contract with West Ham, extending his contract until 30 June 2023, with Lanzini stating "I love London, I love the Club, I am happy here, we have a very good team, we have a very good manager and the Club wants to change and to be in more competitions in the future and that’s good for us". On 9 November, Lanzini suffered a broken collarbone during the closing stages of a 3–0 defeat by Burnley.

2020–21 season
On 18 October 2020, in his first league game of the season, Lanzini scored his first goal of the season in a 3–3 away draw against Tottenham Hotspur. Trailing 3–0 until the 82nd minute, Lanzini scored a spectacular equalizer from 25 yards out in the fourth minute of added time to even the score to 3–3 and salvage a point for the Hammers; he was subsequently awarded the Premier League Goal of the Month award in recognition. Through Lanzini's equaliser, West Ham became the first team in Premier League history to avoid defeat, having been losing by three or more goals, as late in the game as the 81st minute.

International career
In May 2016, Lanzini was named in Argentina's provisional 35-man squad for the 2016 Olympics in Rio de Janeiro. He withdrew from the squad in July 2016 following a knee injury sustained while training in Miami, Florida, returning to London for treatment with West Ham United. In May 2017 Lanzini was named in new Argentina manager Jorge Sampaoli's first squad for the upcoming friendlies against Brazil and Singapore, with Lanzini making his full international debut on 9 June against Brazil at the MCG in Melbourne, Australia, replacing Ever Banega in the 81st minute of Argentina's 1–0 win. On 23 March 2018 he played a friendly match against Italy at the Ethiad Stadium in Manchester and scored his first international goal as Argentina secured a 2–0 victory.

On 21 May 2018 he was named in Argentina’s final 23-man squad for the 2018 FIFA World Cup in Russia, and started in the 4–0 friendly win against Haiti on 29 May in Buenos Aires, playing an hour before being substituted by Maximiliano Meza. On 8 June 2018, Lanzini was ruled out of the World Cup after suffering a ruptured anterior knee ligament injury during a training session.

International goals
 (Argentina score listed first, score column indicates score after each Lanzini goal)

Personal life
Lanzini was born in Greater Buenos Aires, in Ituzaingó, and raised in San Antonio de Padua. He also holds an Italian passport.
His father, Héctor, played for Sporting Cristal and Deportivo Morón, while his brother Tomás has played for Ñublense and Brown de Adrogué.
He is outspoken about his support of River Plate, celebrating club victories on social media, and has a tattoo of himself with the River Plate shirt on.

Career statistics

Club

International

Honours
Fluminense
Campeonato Brasileiro Série A: 2012

River Plate
Argentine Primera División: Torneo Final 2014
Argentina
Superclásico de las Américas: 2017
Individual
West Ham United Players' Player of the Year: 2016–17
Premier League Goal of the Month: October 2020

References

External links

 Manuel Lanzini at West Ham United F.C. (archive)
 
 
 
 
 Argentine Primera statistics at Fútbol XXI  
 "Se dio todo muy rápido" at River Plate — Sitio Official 

1993 births
Living people
Sportspeople from Buenos Aires Province
Association football midfielders
Argentine footballers
Argentine people of Italian descent
Argentine expatriate footballers
Argentine Primera División players
Campeonato Brasileiro Série A players
Club Atlético River Plate footballers
Fluminense FC players
Expatriate footballers in Brazil
UAE Pro League players
Expatriate footballers in the United Arab Emirates
Argentina under-20 international footballers
Al Jazira Club players
West Ham United F.C. players
Expatriate footballers in England
Argentine expatriate sportspeople in Brazil
Argentine expatriate sportspeople in the United Arab Emirates
Argentine expatriate sportspeople in England
Premier League players
Argentina international footballers